Ellen Davis may refer to:

Ellen F. Davis, American theologian and Old Testament scholar
Ellen Davis (businesswoman)